Audea is a genus of moths in the family Erebidae.

Species
bipunctata species group
Audea agrotidea (Mabille, 1879)
Audea bipunctata Walker, 1858 (syn. Audea hypostigmata Hampson, 1913, Audea fatua (Felder and Rogenhofer, 1874))
Audea hemihyala Karsch, 1896 (syn. Audea endophaea Hampson, 1913)
Audea melaleuca Walker, 1865 (syn. Audea postalbida Berio, 1954)
Audea melanoplaga Hampson, 1902
Audea melanoptera Berio, 1985
Audea nigrior Kühne, 2005
Audea stenophaea Hampson, 1913
Audea watusi Kühne, 2005
Audea zimmeri Berio, 1954
delphinensis species group
Audea delphinensis (Viette, 1966)
Audea jonasi Kühne, 2005
Audea subligata Distant, 1902
Audea vadoni (Viette, 1966)
tegulata species group
Audea albiforma Kühne, 2005
Audea blochwitzi Kühne, 2005
Audea irioleuca (Meyrick, 1897)
Audea kathrina Kühne, 2005
Audea luteoforma Kühne, 2005
Audea paulumnodosa Kühne, 2005
Audea tachosoides Kühne, 2005
Audea tegulata Hampson, 1902 (syn. Audea humeralis Hampson, 1902)

Formerly placed here
Audea albifasciata Pinhey, 1968
Audea antennalis Berio, 1954
Audea arabica is now considered a synonym of Ulotrichopus tinctipennis Rebel, 1907
Audea fatilega (Felder and Rogenhofer, 1874)
Audea fumata (Wallengren, 1860)
Audea guichardi Wiltshire, 1982
Audea legrandi Berio, 1959
Audea pseudocatocala Strand, 1918

References
 Audea at Markku Savela's Lepidoptera and Some Other Life Forms
 Natural History Museum Lepidoptera genus database
 Revision und Phylogenie der Gattungsgruppe Crypsotidia Rothschild, 1901, Tachosa Walker, 1869, Hypotacha Hampson, 1913, Audea Walker, 1857 und Ulotrichopus Wallengren, 1860 (Lepidoptera, Noctuidae, Catocalinae)

 
Audeini
Moth genera